Return of the Terror is a 1934 American mystery film directed by Howard Bretherton and written by Peter Milne and Eugene Solow. The film stars Mary Astor, Lyle Talbot, John Halliday, and Frank McHugh, and features Robert Barrat and Irving Pichel. The film was released by Warner Bros. on July 7, 1934. It was a loose remake of the 1928 film The Terror, based on Edgar Wallace's play of the same name.

Plot

Cast     
Mary Astor as Olga Morgan
Lyle Talbot as Dr. Leonard Goodman
John Halliday as Dr. John Redmayne
Frank McHugh as Joe Hastings
Robert Barrat as Pudge Walker
Irving Pichel as Daniel Burke
George E. Stone as Soapy McCoy
J. Carrol Naish as Steve Scola
Frank Reicher as Franz Reinhardt
Robert Emmett O'Connor as Inspector Bradley
Renee Whitney as Virginia Mayo
Etienne Girardot as Mr. Tuttle
Maude Eburne as Mrs. Elvery
Charley Grapewin as Jessup
George Humbert as Tony
Edmund Breese as Editor
George Cooper as Cotton
Cecil Cunningham as Miss Doolittle
Frank Conroy as Prosecuting Attorney
Howard Hickman as Judge
Lorena Layson as Maid
Harry Seymour as City Reporter
Philip Morris as Guard
Bert Moorhouse as First Trooper
Eddie Shubert as Second Trooper

Reception
A.D.S. of The New York Times said, "The Return of the Terror has been managed with the usual Hollywood skill in the physical properties, but its structure has a carpentered look. As the suspicious reporter, Frank McHugh creates a few laughs, but the writing is strictly routine and the necessary humor is largely absent. Robert Emmett O'Connor is excellent as a hard-boiled detective, and the other principals, John Halliday, Mary Astor, Lyle Talbot and Robert Barrat, are entirely satisfactory."

Preservation status
A 35mm print has been preserved by the Library of Congress, and a 16mm print of this film survives at the Wisconsin Center for Film and Theater Research. It was transferred onto 16mm film by Associated Artists Productions in the 1950s and shown on television.

References

External links 
 
 

1934 films
Warner Bros. films
American mystery films
1934 mystery films
Films directed by Howard Bretherton
American black-and-white films
1930s English-language films
1930s American films
Films scored by Bernhard Kaun
American films based on plays
Remakes of American films